YAG laser may refer to two types of lasers that use yttrium aluminum garnet (YAG):

 Nd:YAG laser (doped with neodymium)
 Er:YAG laser (doped with erbium)